Petchey is a surname. Notable people with the surname include:

George Petchey (1931–2019), English footballer and manager
Jack Petchey (born 1925), English businessman and philanthropist
Mark Petchey (born 1970), English tennis player
Michael Petchey (born 1958), English cricketer